Tapir Gao (born 1 October 1964) is an Indian politician. He is the president of Arunachal Pradesh unit of Bharatiya Janata Party (BJP). He was a member of the 14th Lok Sabha (2004-2009), representing the Arunachal East constituency for BJP. He lost from that seat in 2009 and 2014, but was elected to Lok Sabha for the second time in 2019. Gao was General Secretary of BJP in 2011 and is currently national executive member of the BJP.

In February 2020, in the Lok Sabha, he raised the issue of several areas in Arunachal Pradesh being left out from the political map of India. This included "Hadigra Dakahru Pass, Galai Tagaru Pass... in Chaglagam area"

He resides at Village Ruksin in East Siang district.

External links
 Official biographical sketch in Parliament of India website

References

Bharatiya Janata Party politicians from Arunachal Pradesh
India MPs 2004–2009
Living people
1964 births
People from East Siang district
Lok Sabha members from Arunachal Pradesh
India MPs 2019–present
National Democratic Alliance candidates in the 2019 Indian general election
State Presidents of Bharatiya Janata Party